Thangching or Thangjing is a primordial deity in Meitei mythology and religion of Ancient Kangleipak (Antique Manipur). 
He is the ruling deity of the Moirang dynasty of Ancient Moirang. He rules supreme on the banks of the landlocked sea, Loktak lake. He is one of the four cardinal Umang Lais.
The guardianship of the south western direction is alluded to Thangjing and the other directions to Koubru (north west), Marjing (north east) and Wangbren (south east).

Two of his most prominent pantheons are the Thangching Temple and the Thangching Hill (Thangjing Peak).

Origin 
God Thangjing is a deity of pre-Hindu origin.
The Moirang Ningthourol Lambuba mentioned that Moirang was the amalgamation of different groups of people with different traditional beliefs. During the reign of King Fang Fang Ponglenhanpa (52 BC- 28 AD), all the diversities were merged into one with God Thangjing as the central figure.

When the cult of God Thangjing was merged into the Umang Laism, the folk deities associated with God Thangjing began to be identified with other Umang Lais. One example is that of goddess Ayang Leima Ahal and goddess Ayang Leima Atonpi. These two goddesses were originally associated with fertility and agriculture. This fact is evident in the ritualistic songs praising them. Later, these two female deities were identified as the consorts of God Thangjing.

When God Thangjing was identified as an Umang Lai, the identity of the two goddesses was associated with that of goddess Panthoibi. Thus, the new identity of Goddess Ayang Leima Panthoibi was formed.

Description 
Thangjing is described as the Lord of the tiger hunters. The Moirang Ningthourol Lambuba describes God Thangjing as the Divine Chief of Koireng people, the Progenitor of Kege Clan, the Protector of all the domestic as well as wild animals and the Lord of Mahui tribe.

The history of Moirang is always associated with the godly powers of Thangjing. Thangjing is a living God to the people of Ancient Moirang. The epic legend of the Khamba Thoibi is always related to God Thangjing. The ancient temple dedicated to Thangjing still stands on the banks of Loktak lake in the present day Moirang.

Mythology 
In the legendary epic Khamba Thoibi, Lord Thangjing always stands for righteousness and as a saviour of Khamba.

Thangjing sent Phouoibi to Kege Moirang (Keke Moilang) to prosper the human world.

When goddess Panthoibi was searching for her beloved Nongpok Ningthou, she asked God Thangjing and God Wangbren about the whereabouts of Nongpok Ningthou.
To Thangjing, she said:
O! Thangjing, 
Supreme God of Moirang, 
Loktak is your mirror, 
My beloved Nongpok has gone like a wind, 
Like a cattle looking for its herd, 
I am looking for my beloved. 
Please tell me
Does he come to your country?

Worship 

Thangching had been worshipped since ancient times. Still today, there is an ancient shrine at Moirang. An annual ritual festival known as Thangjing Haraoba is held early in summer in honor of the God.
During the annual Thangjing Lai Haraoba festival, traditional dances and sports are performed as rituals. The performers follow the ancient customs of wearing the traditional attires of the royal lords and ladies. The festival is celebrated during the Meitei lunar month of Kalen. It continues for a week. Meiteis from all over Manipur visit the Thangjing Temple in Moirang.

Namesakes

In flora 

The Thangjing plant (Euryale ferox) is an aquatic plant that bears edible seeds. Its seeds are called "foxnuts" and are one of the most popular food items in Meitei cuisine of Manipur.

In geography 
The Thangching Peak (Thangjing Hill) is one of the four peaks, the others being the Koubru (after God Koubru), the Kounu (after Goddess Kounu) and the Loyalakpa (after God Loyalakpa). These peaks are the holy places of worship of the Meitei ethnicity. Their names are derived from the names of the deities whom the Meiteis worship at the peaks.

See also 
 Koupalu (Koubru) - north west protector
 Marjing - north east protector
 Wangbren - south east protector

References

External links 

 English Wikisource
 INTERNET ARCHIVE
 E-pao.net

Abundance gods
Agricultural gods
Animal gods
Arts gods
Crafts gods
Creator gods
Dance gods
Earth gods
Fertility gods
Fortune gods
Guardians of the directions
Harvest gods
Health gods
Hunting gods
Kings in Meitei mythology
Life-death-rebirth gods
Love and lust gods
Magic gods
Maintenance gods
Marriage gods
Meitei deities
Mountain gods
Music and singing gods
Names of God in Sanamahism
Nature gods
Ningthou
Oracular gods
Pastoral gods
Peace gods
Savior gods
Sky and weather gods
Sports gods
Time and fate gods
Trickster gods
Tutelary gods